Aerobic gymnastics was contested at the three editions (2005, 2007, and 2009,) of the defunct Asian Indoor Games.

Medal table

References 

Gymnastics at the Asian Indoor Games
Sports at the Asian Indoor and Martial Arts Games